Roelof Jacobs (born 20 March 1986) is a South African cricketer. He played in one first-class match for Boland in 2008.

See also
 List of Boland representative cricketers

References

External links
 

1986 births
Living people
South African cricketers
Boland cricketers
Cricketers from Kimberley, Northern Cape